WOP! is the debut studio album by Dutch hip-hop artist Lil' Kleine. WOP! entered the Album Top 100 at the number 1 position and remained there for nine weeks, and was certified platinum in April 2016.

Background and release

During the two weeks leading up to the release of the album, its label TopNotch published a series of videos on social media documenting the recording. Although the album was recorded largely by two artists, it was released on 12 February 2016 as a solo album because Flex was also working on his own album at the time and preferred to be seen as merely a featured artist.

In the album's first week, all eleven of its tracks ranked within the top 35 of the Single Top 100 and the album reached number 1 on the Album Top 100 – it is the first hip hop/rap album in the Netherlands to accomplish these feats. In addition, all of the album's tracks also ranked within Spotify’s Netherlands Top 50, with singles "Niet Omdat Het Moet" and "1, 2, 3" at numbers 1 and 2 respectively. "Niet Omdat Het Moet" received over half a million views on YouTube during its first few days, being the most viewed YouTube video in the Netherlands at the time. It also became the most-streamed new album on Spotify in Dutch history, being streamed over 1.5 million times during the 24 hours after its release.

Critical reception
 of de Volkskrant rated WOP! three stars out of five, describing it as "more house than hip hop" and having "a sound that is very much from 1993" which he compared to Robin S.'s "Show Me Love". He added: "While it all sounds catchy and compact, the question arises whether Jack $hirak can think of anything different". Dominic Straub of Nieuweplaat.nl gave $hirak praise, saying: "All in all, this solo album was nothing without Jack $hirak. Despite the many uses of the pan flute tune, he is a huge talent. WOP is fine; there are songs that can become huge hits". Margaret Steenbakker of  described WOP! as "a feel-good album which offers an ode to the good life".

Track listing

Charts

Weekly charts

Year-end charts

Certifications

References

2016 debut albums
Lil' Kleine albums
Dutch-language albums